Thomas Berglund (born February 9, 1969) is a Swedish former professional ice hockey player. He is currently the head coach of the Luleå HF of the Swedish Hockey League (SHL). Berglund played 17 seasons (669 games) with Luleå HF of the Swedish Swedish Elite League.

On January 19, 2015 it was announced that Berglund would become the head coach of Brynäs IF in the Swedish Hockey League.

References

External links

1969 births
Living people
Luleå HF players
Piteå HC players
Swedish ice hockey coaches
Swedish ice hockey forwards
People from Piteå
Sportspeople from Norrbotten County
Luleå HF coaches
Swedish Hockey League coaches